"Let It Be" is a song by the English rock band the Beatles, released on 6 March 1970 as a single, and (in an alternative mix) as the title track of their album Let It Be. It was written and sung by Paul McCartney, and credited to the Lennon–McCartney partnership. The single version of the song, produced by George Martin, features a softer guitar solo and the orchestral section mixed low, compared with the album version, produced by Phil Spector, featuring a more aggressive guitar solo and the orchestral sections mixed higher.

At the time, it had the highest debut on the Billboard Hot 100, beginning its chart run at number 6 and eventually reaching the top. It was the Beatles' final single before McCartney announced his departure from the band. Both the Let It Be album and the US single "The Long and Winding Road" were released after McCartney's announced departure from and the subsequent break-up of the group.

Composition and recording

Origins
McCartney said he had the idea of "Let It Be" after he had a dream about his mother during the tense period surrounding the sessions for The Beatles ("the White Album") in 1968. Mary Patricia McCartney died of cancer in 1956, when he was fourteen. In rehearsing the song with the Beatles in January 1969, in place of the "Mother Mary" lyric, McCartney occasionally sang "Brother Malcolm", a reference to the Beatles' assistant Mal Evans. McCartney later said: "It was great to visit with her again. I felt very blessed to have that dream. So that got me writing 'Let It Be'." In a later interview he said about the dream that his mother had told him, "It will be all right, just let it be." When asked if the phrase "Mother Mary" in the song referred to Mary, mother of Jesus, McCartney has typically replied that listeners can interpret the song however they like.

Recordings

McCartney first began to play around with "Let It Be" in the recording studio in between takes of "Piggies" on 19 September 1968. Some months later, the song would be rehearsed at Twickenham Film Studios on 3 January 1969, where the group had, the previous day, begun what would become the Let It Be film. During this stage of the film they were only recording on the mono decks used for syncing to the film cameras, and were not making multi-track recordings for release. A single take was recorded, with just McCartney on piano and vocals. The first attempt with the other Beatles was made on 8 January. Work continued on the song throughout the month. Multi-track recordings commenced on 23 January at Apple Studios.

The master take was recorded on 31 January 1969, as part of the "Apple studio performance" for the project. McCartney played a Blüthner piano, Lennon played six-string electric bass (replaced by McCartney's own bass part on the final version at the behest of George Martin), George Harrison and Ringo Starr assumed their conventional roles, on guitar and drums respectively, and Billy Preston contributed on Hammond organ. This was one of two suitable performances of "Let It Be" recorded that day. The first version, designated take 27-A, would serve as the basis for all officially released versions of the song. The other version, take 27-B, was included in the film Let It Be as part of the Apple studio performance along with "Two of Us" and "The Long and Winding Road".

Before 2021, the film performance of "Let It Be" was never officially released as an audio recording. The lyrics in the two versions differ a little in the last verse. The studio version has mother Mary comes to me... there will be an answer, whereas the film version has mother Mary comes to me... there will be no sorrow. In addition, McCartney's vocal performance is noticeably different in both versions: in the film version, it sounds rough in certain moments since he is not using anti-pop on his mic; there are also a couple of falsetto vocals performed by him (extending the vocal 'e' on the word 'be'), for instance in the 'let it be' line that precedes the second chorus. Finally, the instrumental progression featured in the middle of the song after the second chorus (that descends from F to C), which is played twice on all released studio versions, is played (or at least is shown being played) only once in the film. A new mix of the take used in the film was included as "Take 28" on the 2021 Super Deluxe edition of the album Let It Be.

On 30 April 1969, Harrison overdubbed a new guitar solo on the best take from 31 January. He overdubbed another solo on 4 January 1970. The first overdub solo was used for the original single release, and the second overdub solo was used for the original album release. Some fans mistakenly believe that there were two versions of the basic trackbased mostly on the different guitar solos, but also on other differences in overdubs and mixes.

Single version

The single used the same cover photographs as the Let It Be album, and was originally released on 6 March 1970, backed by "You Know My Name (Look Up the Number)", with a production credit for George Martin. This version includes orchestration and backing vocals overdubbed on 4 January 1970, under the supervision of Martin and McCartney, with backing vocals that included the only known contribution by Linda McCartney to a Beatles song. It was during this same session that Harrison recorded the second overdubbed guitar solo. The intention at one point was to have the two overdub solos playing together. This idea was dropped for the final mix of the single, and only the 30 April solo was used, although the 4 January overdub can be heard faintly during the final verse. Martin mixed the orchestration very low in this version.

The single mix made its album debut on the Beatles' 1967–1970 compilation album. Original pressings erroneously show the running time of 4:01 (from the Let It Be album), and not the single version's running time of 3:52. This version was also included on 20 Greatest Hits, Past Masters Volume 2 and 1.

The Let It Be EP (1972 Melodiya) was the Beatles' first release in the Soviet Union. The 3-track 7-inch vinyl EP, M62-36715/6, also included "Across the Universe" and "I Me Mine".

Album version

On 26 March 1970, Phil Spector remixed the song for the Let It Be album. This version features Harrison's second guitar solo overdub, fewer backing vocals, a delay effect on Starr's hi-hat, and more prominent orchestration. The final chorus has three "let it be..." lines, as the "there will be an answer" line is repeated twice (instead of once as on the single) before the "whisper words of wisdom" line to close the song. On the album, as the preceding track "Dig It" ends, Lennon is heard saying in a falsetto voice, mimicking Gracie Fields: "That was 'Can You Dig It' by Georgie Wood, and now we'd like to do 'Hark, the Angels Come'."

Anthology version
An early recording of the song appears on the 1996 compilation Anthology 3. This version, take 1, was recorded on 25 January 1969. It is a much simpler version, as McCartney had not written the final verse yet ("And when the night is cloudy ... I wake up to the sound of music ..."). Instead, the first verse is repeated. The track, as released on Anthology 3 also features studio talk between Lennon and McCartney prior to a 31 January 1969 take:

Also, at the end of the song on the Anthology 3 version, Lennon can be heard saying, following another 31 January take, "I think that was rather grand. I'd take one home with me. OK let's track it. (Gasps) You bounder, you cheat!" (This is a reference to the no-overdub policy that the Beatles had adopted for the Get Back project – "tracking" refers to double tracking the vocals on a recording.) The running time of the Anthology version is 4:05.

Let It Be... Naked version

Still another version of the song appeared on the Let It Be... Naked album in 2003. The majority of this remix is take 27-A from 31 January 1969, with parts of take 27-B (as used in the film Let It Be), including the subdued guitar solo, spliced in.

This version contains a different piano track than the one on the studio and single versions. This piano track was taken in part from take 28 which was subsequently released and can be heard on the Super Deluxe re-release of the Let It Be album in 2019.  In the intro, McCartney plays an extra A bass note during the A minor chord (very similar to the way he plays the intro in the film version); he also plays a standard A minor chord in the piano at the first beat of measure two in the last verse (on the lyric "mother", also like in the film version), while the other versions have a different piano harmonisation which can be easily interpreted as an unfixed mistake. The backing vocals in the chorus of this version are similar to those in the single version, but are significantly reduced in volume while still retaining a reverb-heavy, choral effect. Ringo Starr disliked Phil Spector's version where Starr's drumming was augmented by Spector's "tape-delay-effect" to his hi-hats during the song's second verse and added shakers, so Let It Be... Naked features his original "stripped-down-approach" drumming. Also departed were the tom-tom overdub rolls, heard after the guitar solo during the third verse. Starr also commented that after the release of Naked, he would now have to listen to McCartney saying, "I told you so", when talking about Spector's production. The song's running time on Let It Be... Naked is 3:52.

Glyn Johns mixes

Glyn Johns mixed the song on 28 May 1969 as he finished the mixing for the Get Back album. This version was not released at the time. He used the same mix on 5 January 1970, which was an attempt to compile an acceptable version of the LP, this version best exemplifies Glyn's drum recording techniques. Again, this version of the LP was never officially released. The 1969 Glyn Johns version of the LP was included in the 2021 "Super Deluxe" release of Let It Be.

Critical reception

In his review of the single, for the NME, Derek Johnson admired McCartney's performance and the lyrics' "pseudo-religious" qualities. Although he considered that the melody paled beside some of the band's previous singles, Johnson added: "As ever with The Beatles, this is a record to stop you dead in your tracks and compel you to listen attentively." John Gabree of High Fidelity magazine found the lyrics "dangerous politically", but viewed the song as possibly "the best thing musically that McCartney has done". In his album review for Melody Maker, Richard Williams said that McCartney's compositions "seem to be getting looser and less concise" and added that, although the album version of "Let It Be" featured a "much harder guitar solo" than the single, the song "still doesn't have enough substance to become a McCartney standard".

AllMusic critic Richie Unterberger describes "Let It Be" as one of "the Beatles' most popular and finest ballads". In Ian MacDonald's view, the song "achieved a popularity well out of proportion to its artistic weight" and it was "'Hey Jude', without the musical and emotional release". Former Creem critic Richard Riegel included it on his 1996 list of the ten most overrated Beatles tracks, saying that, like Simon & Garfunkel's "Bridge over Troubled Water", the song "cater[ed] to the lowest-common-denominator emotional stasis of its listeners. 'Let It Be' left the Beatles no artistic choice but dissolution."

Lennon also commented disparagingly on "Let It Be". In his 1980 Playboy interview, he disavowed any involvement with composing the song, saying: "That's Paul. What can you say? Nothing to do with the Beatles. It could've been Wings. I don't know what he's thinking when he writes 'Let It Be'."

"Let It Be" was ranked number 2 on CILQ-FM's 2000 list of the "Top 500 Pure Rock Songs
Of The Century". In 2004, the song was included on Grammy Hall of Fame. Mojo magazine ranked "Let It Be" at number 50 in its 2006 list of "The 101 Greatest Beatles Songs". In a similar list compiled in 2010, Rolling Stone placed it at number 8. The magazine also ranked the track at number 20 on its 500 Greatest Songs of All Time list. "Let It Be" holds the top spot on "The Fans' Top 10" poll included in The 100 Best Beatles Songs: An Informed Fan's Guide by Stephen J. Spignesi and Michael Lewis. The song is ranked third on the 100 Best Beatles Songs list, behind "A Day in the Life" and "Strawberry Fields Forever", and continues to bring about numerous pop culture references.

Personnel
According to John Winn's That Magic Feeling, Mark Lewisohn's The Complete Beatles Chronicle and Steve Sullivan's Encyclopedia of Great Popular Song Recordings, Volume 1:

The Beatles
 Paul McCartney – lead and backing vocals, piano, maracas, electric piano, bass guitar
 John Lennon – backing vocals
 George Harrison – lead guitars, backing vocals
 Ringo Starr – drums

Additional musicians
 Linda McCartney – backing vocals
 Billy Preston – Hammond organ
George Martin – string and brass arrangements
 Various session musicians – orchestration

Singles charts

The Beatles:
 Release: 6 March 1970
 Tracks: 7-inch single (Apple) "Let It Be" b/w "You Know My Name (Look Up the Number)"
 Producer: George Martin and Chris Thomas
 UK chart position: number 2
 US Hot 100 chart position: number 1 (2 weeks)
 US easy listening chart position: number 1 (4 weeks)

On the US charts, the song set a number of milestones.
The song gave the Beatles their seventh consecutive year charting a number 1 hit, sharing the all-time record, at the time, with Elvis Presley.
The song gave George Martin his seventh consecutive year producing a number 1 hit, sharing the all-time record, at the time, with Steve Sholes (who produced Presley).
The song gave Lennon and McCartney their seventh consecutive year writing a number 1 hit, an all-time record at the time.

See List of Billboard Hot 100 chart achievements and milestones.

Charts and certifications

Weekly charts

Year-end charts

All-time charts

Certifications

Live performances
Film of the Beatles performance was shown on The Ed Sullivan Show on 1 March 1970.
 

Although the song is performed regularly during McCartney's performances, there are a few notable performances.
 On 13 July 1985, McCartney performed "Let It Be" as one of the closing acts of the Live Aid charity concert in front of an estimated global television audience exceeding one billion people. It was beset by technical difficulties when his microphone failed for the first two minutes of his piano performance, making it difficult for television viewers and impossible for those in the stadium to hear him. As a result, previous performers David Bowie, Bob Geldof, Alison Moyet and Pete Townshend returned to the stage to back him up. He later joked about changing the lyrics to "There will be some feedback, let it be". He re-recorded his vocals afterwards for future home video releases.
 Along with a 700 person congregation, McCartney, Harrison and Starr sang "Let It Be" during a memorial service for Linda McCartney at St Martin-in-the-Fields church in Trafalgar Square, in 1998.
 McCartney also led a crowd rousing rendition as part of the finale of the Concert for New York City, a benefit concert he organised, featuring many famous musicians, that took place on 20 October 2001 at Madison Square Garden in New York City in response to the 11 September attacks.
 In 2003, before playing his concert in Moscow's Red Square, McCartney performed a private rendition for Russian president Vladimir Putin in the Kremlin.
 On 18 July 2008, McCartney performed "Let It Be" with Billy Joel and his band to close the final concert at Shea Stadium in Queens, New York before its demolition.
 On 4 June 2012, McCartney performed the song as part of his set during the Concert for the Queen, celebrating the Diamond Jubilee of Queen Elizabeth II.
 On 25 June 2022, McCartney performed the song as he headlined the Pyramid stage at the Glastonbury festival. The crowd of over 100,000 sang along, likely the biggest crowd the Pyramid stage had ever seen.

Ferry Aid version

In 1987, the song was recorded by charity supergroup Ferry Aid (which included McCartney). It reached number one on the UK Singles Chart for three weeks and reached the top ten in many other European countries. McCartney's verse used the original take from the Beatles' "Let It Be" sessions. Ferry Aid covered "Let It Be" as a charity single to raise money for victims of the Zeebrugge Disaster. The featured artists included McCartney, Boy George, Mark Knopfler and Kate Bush, as well as an ensemble chorus made up of media personalities and other musicians. Although McCartney's contribution was taken from the Beatles' recording, he filmed a segment of himself miming to the track for inclusion in the music video. The single topped the UK Singles Chart for three weeks and was certified gold for shipping over 500,000 copies. It was also a number 1 hit in Norway and Switzerland.

Track listings 
7-inch single
 "Let It Be" – 6:08
 "Let It Be" (The Gospel Jam mix) – 2:50

Charts

Weekly charts

Year-end charts

References

Sources

External links

 

The Beatles songs
1970 songs
Grammy Hall of Fame Award recipients
1970s ballads
1970 singles
1987 singles
Song recordings produced by George Martin
Songs written by Lennon–McCartney
Apple Records singles
CBS Records singles
Billboard Hot 100 number-one singles
Cashbox number-one singles
UK Singles Chart number-one singles
Number-one singles in Germany
Number-one singles in Australia
European Hot 100 Singles number-one singles
Number-one singles in New Zealand
Number-one singles in Norway
RPM Top Singles number-one singles
Number-one singles in Switzerland
Rock ballads
Pop ballads
Joan Baez songs
Aretha Franklin songs
Ike & Tina Turner songs
Bill Withers songs
John Denver songs
Meat Loaf songs
Nick Cave songs
Song recordings produced by Phil Spector
Songs published by Northern Songs
Gospel songs